Alaybey railway station is a railway station on İZBAN's Northern Line. Alaybey is one of the three underground stations on the Northern Line and one of four underground stations in the entire system. The original station was built in 2001 and was served by the Basmane-Aliağa Regional and the Alsancak-Çiğli Commuter Line. The station closed in 2006 and was moved underground as part of the Karşıyaka tunnel. Alaybey was reopened on December 5, 2010.

Railway stations in İzmir Province
Railway stations opened in 2001
2001 establishments in Turkey